The Queen Elizabeth Stakes, first known as Queen's Plate (1854-1872), and then by various other names  at different times in its history (Queen's Cup, Flemington Plate, Canterbury Plate, C.B. Fisher Plate), is an Australian horse race run in Melbourne, Victoria.

Total prize money is A$300,000.

History

Distance

1854–1874 – 3 miles (~4800 metres)
1875–1876 – 2 miles (~3200 metres)
1877–1878 - 2 miles (~3600 metres)
1879 – 2 miles (~3200 metres)
1880 - 2 miles (~3600 metres)
1881–1884 – 2 miles (~3200 metres)
1885 - 2 miles (~4000 metres)
1886–1887 – 2 miles (~3200 metres)
1888 – 3 miles (~4800 metres)
1889 - 2 miles (~3600 metres)
1890–1894 – 2 miles (~3200 metres)
1895–1971 - 1 miles (~2400 metres)
1972 – 2400 metres
1973–1993 – 2500 metres
1994 – 2530 metres
1995 – 2500 metres
1996 – 2531 metres
1997–2005 – 2500 metres
2006–2007 – 2520 metres
2008–2009 – 2500 metres
2010 onwards – 2600 metres

Grade
1854–1978 - Principal Race
1979–2004 - Group 2
2005 onwards - Group 3

Name

1854-1872 - Queen's Plate
1873-1874 - Flemington Plate 
1875-1894 - Canterbury Plate 
1895–1968 - C.B. Fisher Plate 
1969 - Queen's Cup 
1970–1973 - C.B. Fisher Plate 
1974 - Queen's Cup 
1975–1978 - C.B. Fisher Plate 
1979–1984 - Queen Elizabeth Stakes 
1985 - Queen's Cup 
1986–2009 - Queen Elizabeth Stakes 
2010 - Queen's Cup 
2011–2014 - Queen Elizabeth Stakes
2015 - Queen's Cup
2016 - 2021 - Queen Elizabeth Stakes
2022 - Queen's Cup

1951 racebook

Gallery of noted winners

Winners since 1999

Earlier winners

       1998    -       Might And Power
       1997    -       †Bright Spot / Vita Man
       1996    -       Valance
       1995    -       Pindi
       1994    -       Bullwinkle
       1993    -       Hear That Bell
       1992    -       Kawtuban
       1991    -       Frontier Ban
       1990    -       Savage Toss
       1989    -       Our Shannon Lad
       1988    -       Zamakima
       1987    -       Globetrotter
       1986    -   Colour Page
       1985    -       Chelaware
       1984    -       Irish Lord
       1983    -       Fountaincourt
	1982	-	My Sir Avon
	1981	-	Kip
	1980	-	Hyperno
	1979	-	Hyperno
	1978	-	Salamander
	1977	-	Tom's Mate
	1976	-	Perhaps
	1975	-	Four Leaf
	1974	-	Leilani
	1973	-	Director
	1972	-	Scotch And Dry
	1971	-	Classic Mission
	1970	-	Big Philou
	1969	-	Lochcourt
	1968	-	Rain Lover
	1967	-	General Command
	1966	-	Galilee
	1965	-	Craftsman
	1964	-	Piper's Son
	1963	-	Summer Fair
	1962	-	Even Stevens
	1961	-	Dhaulagiri
	1960	-	Nilarco
	1959	-	Webster
	1958	-	Sailor's Guide
	1957	-	Redcraze
       1956	-	Sailor's Guide
	1955	-	Rising Fast
	1954	-	Rising Fast
	1953	-	Hydrogen
	1952	-	Hydrogen
	1951	-	Bronton
	1950	-	Playboy
	1949	-	Dickens
	1948	-	Phoibos
	1947	-	Columnist
	1946	-	Leonard
	1945	-	Don Pedro
	1944	-	Race Not Held
	1943	-	Race Not Held
	1942	-	Race Not Held
	1941	-	High Caste
	1940	-	High Caste
	1939	-	High Caste
	1938	-	Ajax
	1937	-	Black Mac
	1936	-	Queen Of Song
	1935	-	Hall Mark 
	1934	-	Nightly
	1933	-	Rogilla
	1932	-	Kuvera
	1931	-	Veilmond
	1930	-	Phar Lap
	1929	-	Amounis
	1928	-	Gothic
	1927	-	Silvius
	1926	-	Pantheon
	1925	-	Pilliewinkie
	1924	-	Lilypond
	1923	-	Rivoli
	1922	-	Violoncello
	1921	-	Tangalooma
	1920	-	Eurythmic
	1919	-	Artilleryman
	1918	-	Kennaquhair
	1917	-	Wallace Isinglass
	1916	-	Lavendo
	1915	-	Carlita
	1914	-	Mountain Knight
	1913	-	Radnor
	1912	-	Cider
	1911	-	Trafalgar
	1910	-	Alawa
	1909	-	Alawa
	1908	-	Alawa
	1907	-	Mountain King
	1906	-	Dividend
	1905	-	Tartan
	1904	-	Sweet Nell
	1903	-	Combat
	1902	-	Wakeful
	1901	-	Rock Gun
	1900	-	Maltster
	1899	-	Merriwee
	1898	-	The Grafter
	1897	-	Aurum
	1896	-	Bloodshot
	1895	-	†Auraria / Wallace
	1894	-	The Harvester
	1893	-	Patron
	1892	-	The Admiral
	1891	-	Steadfast
	1890	-	Megaphone
	1889	-	Abercorn
	1888	-	Mentor
	1887	-	The Australian Peer
	1886	-	Trident
	1885	-	Trenton
	1884	-	Commotion
	1883	-	Off Colour
	1882	-	Commotion
	1881	-	Wellington
	1880	-	Progress
	1879	-	Suwarrow
	1878	-	Warlock
	1877	-	Pluto
	1876	-	Calamia
	1875	-	Richmond
	1874	-	Melbourne
	1873	-	Don Juan
	1872	-	King Of The Ring
	1871	-	Warrior
	1870	-	Tim Whiffler
	1869	-	Charon
	1868	-	Glencoe
	1867	-	Tim Whiffler
	1866	-	Race Not Held
	1865	-	Volunteer
	1864	-	Race Not Held
	1863	-	Musidora
	1862	-	Race Not Held
	1861	-	Race Not Held
	1860	-	Race Not Held
	1859	-	The Moor
	1858	-	Green Linnet
	1857	-	Crockford
	1856	-	Tomboy
	1855	-	I Want It
	1854	-	Shadow

† Dead heat

See also
Thoroughbred racing in Australia
Melbourne Spring Racing Carnival
 VRC Stakes day
 List of Australian Group races
 Group races

References

Horse races in Australia
Flemington Racecourse